Abdul Qayoum Kochai is an Afghan diplomat. He was born in 1937 in Surkhab, Logar Province. He was an ambassador of Afghanistan to Russia.

References

1941 births
Afghan diplomats
Ambassadors of Afghanistan to Russia
Living people
People from Logar Province